Anna Katarina Monica Luhr (born 8 January 1973) is a Swedish politician and member of the Riksdag, the national legislature. A member of the Green Party, she has represented Stockholm Municipality since October 2022. She is a member of the municipal council in Stockholm Municipality.

References

1973 births
Living people
Members of the Riksdag 2022–2026
Members of the Riksdag from the Green Party
People from Stockholm
Women members of the Riksdag
21st-century Swedish women politicians